Alverstraumen is a village in Alver Municipality in Vestland county, Norway.  The village is located at the southern tip of the island of Radøy. The Alversund Bridge connects Alverstraumen to the village of Alversund across the Alverstraumen strait to the east.

References

Villages in Vestland
Alver (municipality)